Dark Diary is the fifth full-length studio album released by the Romanian power metal band Magica.

Track listing
 "Anywhere But Home" 4:22
 "Tonight" 03:32
 "Never Like You" 03:59
 "Wait for Me" 04:18
 "Need" 04:00
 "Release My Demons" 04:08
 "On the Side of Evil" 04:21
 "My Kin My Enemy" 04:05
 "Used to be an Angel" 03:34
 "We are Horde" 04:21
 "Dear Diary" 01:52
 "Victory" (Bonus Track) 4:31

Credits
Ana Mladinovici - Vocals
Bogdan Costea - Guitar
Sorin Vlad - Bass
6Fingers - Keyboards
Hertz - Drums

References

2010 albums
Magica (band) albums
AFM Records albums